Giulio Cesare Rubino was an Italian composer of whom little biographical information is known. He was active in the 17th and 18th centuries. His surviving compositions include a psalm Confitebor and some secular cantatas. One cantata Oh cielo, oh ammore was composed for lady Clelia Caracciolo, marchese of Arena. The cantata Lena was recorded by Marco Beasley.

References

17th-century Italian composers
18th-century Italian composers
18th-century Italian male musicians
Italian Baroque composers
Italian male classical composers
17th-century male musicians